The Women's floor gymnastics at the 2017 Summer Universiade in Taipei was held on 23 August at the Taipei Nangang Exhibition Center.

Schedule
All times are Taiwan Standard Time (UTC+08:00)

Results

References

Women's floor